Dean George Popps was Acting United States Assistant Secretary of the Army for Acquisition, Logistics, and Technology from 2008 to 2010.

Biography
Popps was born in Denver. He is a Greek American. He was educated at Marquette University, graduating in 1970 with a B.A. in Political Science and Philosophy. While in college, he was a member of the Army Reserve Officers' Training Corps. As a younger man, he worked for the United States House of Representatives, the United States Senate, and the District of Columbia criminal court system. From 1975 to 1979, he attended the Potomac School of Law, receiving a J.D. in 1979.

In 1980, Popps joined Communications Technology Management, Inc. as Operations Manager. He was later promoted to Senior Account Executive and Director of Program Development before becoming Chief Operating Officer in 1984, holding that position until 1986. In 1984, with Crow Holdings, Popps also founded Dallas Fort Worth Teleport, a company that manufactured teleports. He served as President and Chief Executive Officer of Dallas Fort Worth Teleport until 1999, when the company was acquired by a competitor. Popps was one of the original incorporators of C-SPAN and his company provided satellite services for the network. His company also provided the satellite link between the American Broadcasting Company and the National Captioning Institute.

After the sale of his company, Popps lived in semi-retirement. In 2001, he became Chief Operations Supervisor during the Chapter 7 bankruptcy of Computer Learning Centers, Inc.

In the wake of the Iraq War, Popps was recruited by the Coalition Provisional Authority to serve as its Director of Industrial Conversion, part of the privatization of the Iraq economy, which had previously had a planned economy. In this capacity, he was in charge of restructuring the former regime's state-owned 52 Military Industry Commission companies into the new Iraqi Ministry of Science and Technology. He then served as the CPA Deputy Senior Advisor to that ministry, in which role he assisted in the conversion of the Al Tuwaitha nuclear facility, and helped to find new jobs for scientists previously assigned to design and build Iraqi weapons of mass destruction. He served on the CPA's Iraq Transition Planning Team in June 2004, participating in the handover of authority to the Government of Iraq.

In 2004, Popps became Principal Deputy Assistant Secretary of the Army for Acquisition, Logistics, and Technology. He also served as the Army's Director of Iraq Reconstruction and Program Management, with oversight of the executive agency of the Iraq Relief and Reconstruction Fund.

Popps served as Acting United States Assistant Secretary of the Army for Acquisition, Logistics, and Technology from January 2, 2008 until March 4, 2010. From April to October 2008, he was also a member of the Commission on Wartime Contracting in Iraq and Afghanistan. He retired from government service on April 16, 2010.

References
 "New Wartime Contracting Commissioners Named, June 20, 2008
 Biography of Popps

External links

United States Army civilians
Year of birth missing (living people)
Living people
Lawyers from Denver
American people of Greek descent
Marquette University alumni
American chief operating officers